I'll Play the Blues for You is the seventh studio album by Albert King released in 1972.

In 2017, the single version of the title track was inducted in to the Blues Hall of Fame.

Track listing
"I'll Play the Blues for You, Pts. 1-2" (Jerry Beach) – 7:20
"Little Brother (Make a Way)" (Henry Bush, Marshall Jones, Carl Smith) – 2:49
"Breaking up Somebody's Home" (Al Jackson Jr., Timothy Matthews) – 7:19
"High Cost of Loving" (Sherwin Hamlett, Allen A. Jones) – 2:56
"I'll Be Doggone" (Pete Moore, Smokey Robinson, Marvin Tarplin) – 5:41
"Answer to the Laundromat Blues" (Albert King) – 4:37
"Don't Burn Down the Bridge ('Cause You Might Wanna Come Back Across)" (Allen A. Jones, Carl Wells) – 5:07
"Angel of Mercy" (Homer Banks, Raymond Jackson) – 4:20
Bonus Tracks Stax Remasters 2012 (previously unreleased)
"I'll Play the Blues for You" (alternate version) - 8:44
"Don't Burn Down the Bridge ('Cause You Might Want To Come Back Across)" (alternate version) - 5:13
"I Need a Love" - 4:29
"Albert's Stomp" - 2:18

Personnel
 Albert King – electric guitar, vocals
 The Memphis Horns – horns
 The Bar-Kays & The Movement – rhythm section
 Allen Jones - arrangements, producer
 Henry Bush - arrangements, engineer, producer
Bernard Nagler - photography

References

1972 albums
Albert King albums
Albums produced by Allen Jones (record producer)
Stax Records albums